Erigeron bloomeri is a North American species of flowering plants in the family Asteraceae known by the common name scabland fleabane.

Erigeron bloomeri is native to the slopes, meadows, and hillsides of the western United States (California,  Nevada, Oregon, Idaho, northwestern Utah).

Erigeron bloomeri is a short, small perennial herb rarely more than 20 cm (8 inches) tall, forming clumps over a taproot. It has mostly basal leaves several centimeters long which may be densely hairy to nearly hairless. Atop the short erect stems are inflorescences consisting of single flower heads. Each head is 1-2 centimeters (0.4-0.8 inches) wide and is packed with many small golden yellow disc florets, but no ray florets.

Varieties
Erigeron bloomeri var. bloomeri - California, Idaho, Nevada, Oregon, Utah
Erigeron bloomeri var. nudatus (A.Gray) Cronquist - Del Norte and Siskiyou Counties in extreme northern California

References

External links
Jepson Manual Treatment
United States Department of Agriculture Plants Profile
Calphotos Photo gallery, University of California

Plants described in 1865
bloomeri
Flora of the Western United States
Flora without expected TNC conservation status